Velika Stara Vas is a village in the Municipality of Grosuplje in central Slovenia. It lies northeast of Grosuplje in the historical region of Lower Carniola. The municipality is now included in the Central Slovenia Statistical Region.

References

External links

Velika Stara Vas on Geopedia

Populated places in the Municipality of Grosuplje